The 2002/03 NTFL season was the 82nd season of the Northern Territory Football League (NTFL).

St Marys have won there 23rd premiership title while defeating the Palmerston in the grand final by 11 points.

Grand Final

References

Northern Territory Football League seasons
NTFL